Gerard McStay (1928 - August 2001) was a Gaelic footballer who played as a centre-back for the Clan na Gael club and at senior level for the Armagh county team.

References

1928 births
2001 deaths
Armagh inter-county Gaelic footballers
Clan na Gael CLG Gaelic footballers